Pingasa elutriata is a moth of the family Geometridae first described by Louis Beethoven Prout in 1916. It is found in northern India.

References

https://animaldiversity.org/accounts/Pingasa_elutriata/classification/- website reference

Pseudoterpnini
Moths of Asia
Moths described in 1916
Taxa named by Louis Beethoven Prout